Peter Dolby (18 May 1940 – 28 February 2019) was an English professional football centre half who made over 320 appearances in the Football League for Shrewsbury Town.

Playing career 
He was the fifth club legend to be inducted into the club's Hall of Fame in 2011.

Personal life 
After retiring from football, Dolby ran a newsagent's and worked as a teacher.

Dolby died in his sleep in the early hours of 28 February 2019.

References 

1940 births
2019 deaths
English footballers
English Football League players
Heanor Town F.C. players
Shrewsbury Town F.C. players
Footballers from Derby
Schoolteachers from Derbyshire
Association football wing halves